Events from the year 1745 in Scotland.

Incumbents 

 Secretary of State for Scotland: The Marquess of Tweeddale

Law officers 
 Lord Advocate – Robert Craigie
 Solicitor General for Scotland – Robert Dundas, the younger

Judiciary 
 Lord President of the Court of Session – Lord Culloden
 Lord Justice General – Lord Ilay
 Lord Justice Clerk – Lord Milton

Events 
 11 May – War of the Austrian Succession: Battle of Fontenay in the Low Countries: Although this is a decisive French victory, the 43rd Highland Regiment of Foot (the 'Black Watch') distinguishes itself in its first battle.
 23 July – Jacobite rising: The Young Pretender Charles Edward Stuart lands on Eriskay in the Hebrides from the Du Teillay.
 16 August – Jacobite rising: A Jacobite victory at Highbridge Skirmish. 
 19 August – Jacobite rising: Charles Stuart raises his standard at Glenfinnan.
 September – Jacobite rising: Duncan Forbes, Lord Culloden, is commissioned to raise 18 new Independent Highland Companies from clans loyal to the government.
 11 September – Jacobite rising: Jacobites enter Edinburgh.
 16 September – Jacobite rising: "Canter of Coltbrigg": The 13th and 14th Dragoons flee Jacobites near Edinburgh.
 17 September – Jacobite rising: In Edinburgh, Charles Stuart proclaims his father James Francis Edward Stuart as James VIII of Scotland.
 21 September – Jacobite rising: Government forces are defeated at the Battle of Prestonpans.
 Autumn – Meikleour Beech Hedges planted.
 13–15 November – Jacobite rising: Jacobites besiege and capture Carlisle, across the English border. 
 December – Jacobite rising: Jacobite garrison in Carlisle surrenders to Hanoverian forces under Prince William, Duke of Cumberland. 
 4 December – Jacobite rising: Jacobite forces reach as far south in England as Derby causing panic in London.
 6 December – Jacobite rising: Jacobite forces decide to retreat to Scotland.
 18 December – Jacobite rising: A Jacobite victory at the Clifton Moor Skirmish, the last action between two military forces on English soil.
 23 December – Jacobite rising: A Jacobite victory at the Battle of Inverurie.
 Prospectus issued for "The Company for Improving the Linen Manufactury in Scotland", which becomes the British Linen Bank.

Births 
 12 May – William Creech, bookseller and Lord Provost of Edinburgh (died 1815)
 24 May – Thomas Potter, industrialist, founder of Denmark's first iron foundry (died 1811 in Copenhagen)
 23 June – James Graham, quack doctor (died 1794)
 2 July – Robert Calder, admiral (died 1818 in Hampshire)
 26 July – Henry Mackenzie, novelist, writer, poet and lawyer (died 1831)
 William Cruikshank, anatomist and chemist (died 1800 in London)
 Anne Forbes, Scottish portrait painter (died 1834)
 Approximate date – Sydney Parkinson, botanical illustrator (died 1771 at sea)

Deaths 
 Spring – William Meston, poet (born c. 1688)
 May – Rachel Chiesley, Lady Grange, abductee (born 1679)

References 

 
Years of the 18th century in Scotland
Scotland
1740s in Scotland